Max Schubel (April 11, 1932 – February 10, 2010) was an American composer of contemporary classical music.  He is best known for being the founder and owner of Opus One records, a company dedicated to the recording of new music.

Schubel maintained homes in Napanoch, Town of Wawarsing, Ulster County, New York (living there from November through April) and Piscataquis County, Maine (living there from May 1 through October).

External links
Max Schubel page from the American Music Center Online Library site.
Max. W. Schubel  obituary

20th-century classical composers
American male classical composers
American classical composers
1932 births
2010 deaths
21st-century classical composers
People from Wawarsing, New York
People from Piscataquis County, Maine
21st-century American composers
20th-century American composers
20th-century American male musicians
21st-century American male musicians